The Medina Bridge (Spanish: Puente de Medina) is a medieval bridge in Arévalo, Spain.

History and description 
It crosses over the Arevalillo. Built in mudéjar style in the 14th century, it displays three main eyes in the form of pointed arches. It was declared monumento histórico-artístico (precursor of the status of Bien de Interés Cultural via Royal Decree issued on 19 October 1983 (published in the Boletín Oficial del Estado on 27 December 1983).

References 
Citations

Bibliography
 

Bien de Interés Cultural landmarks in the Province of Ávila
Bridges in Castile and León
Buildings and structures in the Province of Ávila
Stone bridges in Spain